The Opel cam-in-head engine (CIH) is a family of automobile engines built by former General Motors subsidiary Opel from 1965 until 1998. Both four- and six-cylinder inline configurations were produced. The name derives from the location of the camshaft, which was neither cam-in-block nor a true overhead camshaft. In the CIH engine the camshaft is located in the cylinder head but sits alongside the valves rather than above them. The overhead valves are actuated through very short tappets and rocker arms. The four-cylinder CIH was largely supplanted by the Family II unit as Opel/Vauxhall's core mid-size engine in the 1980s. A four-cylinder version of the CIH remained in limited production until 1998, and six-cylinder versions of the CIH until 1995.

A diesel version of the CIH was also developed. This engine debuted in the Opel Rekord D in 1972.

Design

The original design of the cam-in-head engine was done by General Motors in Detroit, Michigan.

Although the camshaft is in the cylinder head, the CIH is not a true overhead camshaft design. Rather it can be thought of as a cam-in-block engine with a greatly shortened valve drivetrain. The camshaft is driven by a roller chain. While the earliest engines used mechanical lifters, later versions used hydraulic tappets, which Opel pioneered for mass market production in the Family II unit which ultimately replaced the CIH. The cylinder head is a non-crossflow layout. This led to lowered fuel economy but was considerably cheaper to manufacture. The head and block are both made from cast iron. The CIH engine was oversquare, with the original three versions having a stroke of only .

While an improvement over a cam-in-block engine, the advantages over an OHC design were limited. For one, the lower head allowed for a correspondingly lower bonnet line. The CIH engine was also lighter (negated somewhat by the use of a cast iron head) and was expected to require less maintenance than an OHC design.

Opel developed their own crossflow head for the CIH block, and tested it in the experimental GT-2 of 1975 with the intent of installing it in the production model. In four-cylinder form, this engine reached only limited production as the Kadett GT/E's 20EH engine. The crossflow head did see mass production in six-cylinder form as the 3.0 24V in the Opel Senator B.

Four-cylinder versions

1.5 litre I4
This is the smallest of the three original CIH engines introduced simultaneously. A  bore and stroke gives a  displacement. As with most of Opel's engines of the 1960s and 1970s, versions optimized for low and high octane fuel were offered, with the 15N for normal and the 15S for super. SAE output was 76 hp at 5600 rpm.

This engine was imported by Daewoo's predecessor companies GM Korea and Saehan Motors and went on to be built in South Korea by Daewoo beginning around 1983. The automobile taxation system of South Korea greatly favours engines of less than 1.5 litres displacement. It was installed in the Saehan Camina, the Saehan Gemini series, and in the Saehan/Daewoo Royale (until 1987). 1.9 and 2.0 litre versions were also built in Korea.

Applications
August 1965 - July 1966 Opel Rekord B
August 1966 - January 1970 Opel Rekord C
September 1967 - 1970 Opel Kadett B 1.5 S (export only, Finland/Austria/Sweden/USA)
September 1967 - 1970 Opel Olympia A 1.5 S (export only)
March 1976 - 1978 Saehan Camina
December 1977 - 1982 Saehan Gemini
1979 - 1988 Saehan/Daewoo Max (pickup version of Gemini/Kadett C)
1972 - 1982 Saehan Rekord
1982 - 1987 Daewoo Royale

1.6 litre I4
The  version has a  bore and the same  stroke as most CIH fours. It was introduced in September 1970 with the all new Opel Manta A and then, seven weeks later, in the Opel Ascona A. As with the 1.5 litre, a 16N for lower octane fuel and a more powerful 16S for higher octane fuel were offered. From 1975 there was also a still-cleaner A16S version with 69 PS for some markets, this specific model also had a forged crank with 8 crankweights. It was replaced by a  version of the Family II engine that appeared in the Opel Ascona C/Vauxhall Cavalier Mk II.

Applications
September 1970 - August 1975 Opel Manta A
October 1970 - September 1975 Opel Ascona A
August 1975 - May 1981 Opel Manta B
September 1975 - August 1981 Opel Ascona B
May 1977 - August 1979 Opel Kadett C 1.6 S
November 1975 - July 1981 Vauxhall Cavalier Mark I

1.7 litre I4
The  CIH was another of the original three introduced. Bore is  while stroke remains . The 1700 was only ever available in carburetted form, for either normal or super petrol with corresponding power outputs. Claimed SAE output for the 17S was 84 hp at 5600 rpm.

In the larger Rekord, the 17S was popular in export markets like Italy and Greece where owners' costs were directly linked to engine displacement.

Applications
August 1965 - July 1966 Opel Rekord B
August 1966 - December 1971 Opel Rekord C
September 1967 – 1970 Opel Kadett B 1.7 S
August 1967 - July 1970 Opel Olympia A
January 1972 - August 1977 Opel Rekord D
August 1977 - 1980 Opel Rekord E
February 1970 - December 1971 Ranger A
January 1972 - August 1977 Ranger B
August 1972 - 1976 Chevrolet 1700 (South Korea)

1.9 litre I4

The  CIH was the largest of the original three introduced. Bore is  while the stroke remains . The 1900 was available in carburetted or fuel injected forms, for either normal or super petrol with a variety of power outputs. An N version was a later addition. Output is  DIN at 5100 rpm for the original 19S; SAE power is 102 hp at 5400 rpm. There was also the 19HL (Hochleistung, or "high power"), introduced in 1967 for the sporty Opel Rekord Sprint and Kadett Rallye Sprint models. The 1900 is the most common version in the CIH family, available in the most versions and with the longest production time.

The 19E was the first of the CIH four-cylinders to receive fuel injection. This specific model, along with the S16S, had a forged crank with 8 crankweights.

Applications
August 1965 - July 1966 Opel Rekord B
August 1966 - December 1971 Opel Rekord C
September 1967 - July 1973 Opel Kadett B Rallye (19 S/HL)
August 1967 - July 1970 Opel Olympia A coupé (19S)
October 1968 - middle 1973 Opel GT
September 1970 - August 1975 Opel Manta A
October 1970 - September 1975 Opel Ascona A
January 1972 - August 1977 Opel Rekord D
August 1975 - May 1981 Opel Manta B
September 1975 - August 1981 Opel Ascona B
September 1975 - July 1979 Opel Kadett C GT/E (19E only)
August 1977 - August 1982 Opel Rekord E
February 1970 - December 1971 Ranger A
January 1972 - August 1977 Ranger B
May 1974 - February 1976 Holden Torana LH
February 1976 - November 1976 Holden Torana LX
November 1976 - March 1978 Holden Sunbird LX
March 1978 - 1978 Holden Sunbird LX
1978 - 1985 Saehan/Daewoo Rekord/Royale
November 1975 - July 1981 Vauxhall Cavalier Mark I

2.0 litre I4
The  CIH was based on the 1.9 litre version, with the bore expanded to  while the stroke remained . Unlike the earlier 1.9, the 2.0 received hydraulic tappets. Developed to counteract the diminishing outputs which resulted from stricter emissions rules, the 2.0 was available in carburetted or fuel injected forms, for either normal or super petrol with a variety of power outputs. A  20N version appeared in August 1977. There are also two special low-emission versions for the Swedish and Swiss markets, called the S20S and S20E, with slightly less power than their dirtier counterparts.

Applications
September 1975 - August 1977 Opel Rekord D
September 1977 - August 1988 Opel Manta B
September 1977 - August 1981 Opel Ascona B
September 1977 - July 1979 Opel Kadett C GT/E, Rallye (20E/EH)
August 1977 - June 1986 Opel Rekord E
1984 - 1990 Chevrolet Rekord (South Africa)
1978 - 1985 Saehan/Daewoo (Rekord) Royale
November 1975 - July 1981 Vauxhall Cavalier Mark I
late 1978 - June 1986 Vauxhall Carlton

2.2 litre I4
The 2.2 CIH engine was fuel injected and was produced from 1984 through 1987. Its bore was 95mm but stroke was increased to 77.5mm. Also, the cylinder head was redesigned. It had bigger valves and intake ports were lifted. Also, hardened valve seats were added to accept unleaded fuel. 
Power output rose slightly:  / 
.
It was used in the Opel Rekord E, Opel Monza A2 and Opel Senator A2.

2.4 litre I4

The 2.4 L was the final four-cylinder CIH version. Bore remained same 95mm but stroke was increased to 85mm. Power output: 
/ . It was first used in the Omega A in the German market, while the 2.0 L Family II unit was the top spec four-cylinder engine option for the Omega in most markets outside of Germany. Its final application was in the Frontera SUV.

Applications:
1992-1998 Opel Frontera A
1988-1993 Opel Omega A

400 I4 / Cosworth KAA

In the early 1970s Opel announced a new DOHC engine project intended to be used in Formula 2 (F2). The engine was designed in-house, and was unveiled in 1975. Homologated in Group 4 rallying, the engine suffered a series of failures, which prompted Opel to contact Cosworth engineering.

With the basic design of the engine already frozen, Cosworth's work included revising the port and camshaft shapes and extensive development work with a focus on reliability. Compression was 11.5:1. Air and fuel were fed by twin 48DCOE Weber carburettors, and the engine received a dry sump.

As a result of their successful work on the racing version of the engine, Cosworth was awarded the contract to build the 400 copies of the engine required to homologate the Ascona 400, and more later to homologate the Manta 400. Cosworth also consulted on the fuel injection system that replaced the carburettors on the road-going version.

Six-cylinder versions
The straight-six CIH was used in the largest Opel and Vauxhall cars from 1968 to 1993. It was succeeded by the Opel-designed 54° V6 in the mid-1990s.

Most of these engines were single cam-in-head engines with chain-driven camshafts. In the 1960s and 1970s, all came with carburetors, but were later fitted with Bosch fuel injection in the early 1980s. Some later six-cylinder family members received true DOHC multivalve cylinder heads.

2.2 litre I6
This is the rarest of the inline-sixes. At only , it shares its  bore and  stroke with the 1.5 litre "four". It debuted in December 1966. With  it had only marginally more power than the 1900S, at a substantial weight and cost penalty. It was dropped from the Rekord C following the introduction of the six-cylinder Commodore line in February 1967, and was discontinued entirely towards the end of 1968, when the 1969 models were introduced.

Applications
December 1966 - 1967 Opel Rekord C
February 1967 - August 1968 Opel Commodore A

2.5 litre I6

The modern Opel straight-six line began in 1968 with the  25S unit used in the Opel Commodore.

Applications
 August 1968 - January 1972 Opel Commodore A
 January 1972 - July 1977 Opel Commodore B
 August 1977 - August 1982 Opel Commodore C / Vauxhall Viceroy
 January 1978 - August 1987 Opel Senator A / Vauxhall Royale/Senator
 February 1970 - December 1971 Ranger A
 January 1972 - August 1977 Ranger B

2.6 litre I6
At the introduction of the 24v DOHC engine in the Senator/Carlton/Omega, the 2.5 was enlarged to 2.6 litres. With a reworked 12-valve cylinder head and RAM induction it now produced . This engine was also fitted to southeast Asian export market versions of the Holden VP, VR, and VS Commodores between around 1992 and 1997. These cars were usually labelled "Opel Calais".

2.8 litre I6
The 2.8 was introduced in Kapitän/Admiral and Commodore model. The carburetted version can also be found in the Monza and Senator, while the second Commodore was also available with a fuel-injected version.

Single Carb 28S: .

Dual Carb 28H: .

Injection 28EC: .

3.0 litre I6
The  version was introduced in 1977.

The 1986 Opel Omega 3000 / Vauxhall Carlton GSi introduced the latest version of the 3.0. Amongst the changes were larger valves and a switch in engine management to Bosch Motronic. This engine later found its way into the Senator and Omega 3.0i.

3.6 litre C36GET I6
In 1990 a special version of the six cylinder appeared in the Lotus Carlton-Omega. Lotus reportedly experimented with a variety of forced induction schemes, including paired supercharging and turbocharging and sequential turbos, before settling on two small turbos for quick spool-up. Two Garrett AiResearch T25 turbochargers and a Behr air-to-water intercooler were used. The turbos were arranged in parallel, each fed by and feeding three cylinders. The fuel injection system was customized. Apart from a reduction in compression ratio to 8.2:1, the cylinder head was otherwise unmodified.

Third-party tuner versions
Crossflow and multi-valve cylinder heads for the CIH block were developed by a number of well-known German tuning companies such as Irmscher, Mantzel, Risse, and Steinmetz.

Swedentop
Extensive work on a revised four cylinder head with larger valves, enlarged ports, and revised camshaft profiles was done in Sweden, particularly by ENEM in Nacka. These heads and other parts were used for rallying, and the changes were later copied by Opel for factory backed cars.

3.0i I6
The Omega Evo had a special Irmscher version of the 24-valve engine with an uprated head and forged internals producing .

3.6i I6
Irmscher made a 3.6i 12v engine and fitted this 36E coded engine into the Monza E and Monza GSE models. In the UK some of these engines found their way into Vauxhall Senator Bs instead.

In late 1987 newer, more environmentally friendly versions of this engine with tuning by Irmscher were installed in versions of the Omega A/Mk3 Carlton and Senator B models. These later units, with engine codes 36NE, C36NE, and C36NEI, produced, less than the first  engines that were used to power the earlier Opel Monzas. 24-valve versions of the 3.6 were also developed.

4.0i I6
4.0 L 24v DOHC versions of the six cylinder CIH were made Irmscher and Mantzel.

Mantzel's  engine used an M4024V code number and modified standard 30NE/C30NE/C30LE/C30SE coded Opel engine blocks for its 4.0 litre conversions. This is used as an option in the 1980 - 1986 Bitter SC.

The Irmscher engine had a C40SE code and was the only one of these two engines to use a specially cast engine block as part of this increased capacity engine conversion. The Irmscher version produced . It was installed in the Opel Omega A and Senator B, and was an option in the Opel Omega Evolution 500 models.

OHC Diesel versions
Diesel derivatives of the CIH engine family first appeared in September 1972, and progressively became more popular in the following two decades. These compression-ignition engines were used in Opel's medium or high range cars and were designed for maximum fuel economy and long life, with performance a secondary consideration. They received a stiffened block, longer strokes, and a single overhead cam head, the latter two making this engine considerably taller than the petrol CIH units. Most installations required a noticeable bump in the bonnet to fit the taller diesel engines. All OHC Diesels were inline four-cylinder engines. They were offered in three displacements, listed below.

2.0 litre diesel
The 2.0 litre saw wider use at the end of the 1970s, but in some markets, including Italy, it had appeared already at the end of 1974. It was built only in naturally aspirated form and in a single variant, the 20D, whose compression ratio was 22:1. Fuel supply was provided by Bosch injection. This engine was available in:

Opel Rekord D 2.0 D (1974-77 in select markets, including Italy)
Opel Rekord E 2.0 D (1977–81)
Opel Ascona B 2.0 D (1978–81)

2.1 litre diesel
The CIH 2.1 litre diesel engine appeared in 1972 as an engine option in the Opel Rekord D range. This engine has the distinction of marking the debut of the Rüsselsheim company in the production of diesel engines. It was built only in naturally aspirated form and in only one variant; the 21D. The compression ratio and the fuel injection system were the same 22:1 and Bosch system used later in the 20D. It appeared in:

Opel Rekord D 2.1 D (1972–77)
Opel Rekord E 2.1 D (1977–81)

2.3 litre diesel
The CIH 2.3 litre diesel engine was introduced in 1979 and by the 1980s had become a staple of Opel's automotive production for high-end diesel models.
This engine resulted from the reworking of the 2.1 litre diesel engine, which was also slated for replacement. Unlike the other two CIH diesel versions, the 2.3 litre was offered in several variants, some of which used forced induction in either a turbocharged version or the very rare Comprex configuration. Forced induction diesels have few differences to N/A engines: sintered metal dry cylinder sleeves, piston cooling oil squirts with oil feed pipe outside cylinder block and high volume oil pump.

Variants of the 2.3 litre version are listed below.

23D
With this code the debut variant of the 2.3 litre diesel engine is indicated. It is a naturally aspirated engine with a compression ratio of 22:1 and Bosch fuel injection. Some features were taken from the previous naturally aspirated 2.1 litre. This engine appeared in:

Opel Rekord E 2.3D (1979-1986)
Bedford CF1 (1980-1986)

23DK
This variant was produced for a short period of time; from 1984 to 1986. It is a supercharged variant, but instead of the classic turbocharger it used a Comprex pressure wave supercharger. The compression ratio was 23:1 and the fuel system was Bosch injection. It was used in:

Opel Senator A 2.3 Comprex D (1984-1986)

23DT
This variant was also introduced in 1984 and was also supercharged, but unlike the 23DK unit, used a traditional turbocharger. The 23DT is Opel's first turbodiesel engine. As in the 20DK Comprex variant, the compression ratio is 23:1, and the injection system is by Bosch. The turbocharger used was a KKK K24. This engine found use in:

Opel Rekord E 2.3 TD (1984–86)
Opel Senator A 2.3 TD (1984–86)

23YD
This variant is a naturally aspirated model introduced in September 1986, a few months after the launch of the Opel Omega A which the engine was developed for. Compared to the earlier naturally aspirated 23D, the compression ratio was raised from 22:1 to 23:1, while the injection system has remained unchanged. From 1989 on the engine had a catalytic converter.

Opel Omega A 2.3 D (1986–93)

23YDT
This model was a 2.3 litre turbodiesel that resulted from an update of the previous 23DT.

Opel Omega A 2.3 TD (1986-1988)

23DTR
This model is the last CIH Four diesel engine produced by Opel. It is an update of the 23YDT unit which it replaced beginning in August 1988. Compared to the previous version, the turbocharger was changed from a KKK K24 to a K14 from the same manufacturer and added air-to-air intercooler. This engine delivered a maximum power of  4200 rpm and was installed in the following models:

Opel Omega A 2.3 TD (1988–93)
Opel Frontera A 2.3 TD (1991–95)

Motorsports
The CIH engine had a long competition career in both four- and six-cylinder forms. It won the 1966 European Rally Championship, with Swedish driver Lillebror Nasenius at the wheel of an Opel Rekord B.

In 1969 Virgilio Conrero became the official director of Opel's rally team, with responsibility for preparing the cars and selecting drivers. The arrangement lasted until 1986. Conrero prepared cars first appeared in hill climbs. In 1971 an Opel GT won the GT2.0 class at the Targa Florio.

In June 1972, prior to the September launch of their new diesel engine, Opel set two world records and eighteen international records at the Dudenhofen proving ground with their diesel Rekordwagen. The car was a custom-bodied single-seat Opel GT with a turbocharged version of the 2.1 L OHC diesel engine developing .

References

Further reading
 
 

Opel CIH
Straight-four engines
Straight-six engines
Gasoline engines by model
Diesel engines by model